Rhabdoblennius snowi, Snow's rockskipper or the Snow blenny, is a species of combtooth blenny found in coral reefs in the Pacific ocean.  This species reaches a length of  TL. The specific name of this blenny honours the collector of the type, the missionary Benjamin Galen Snow (1817-1880).

References

snowi
Taxa named by Henry Weed Fowler 
Fish described in 1928